Lower Danube Euroregion is a Euroregion located in Romania, Republic of Moldova and Ukraine. The administrative center is Galați. In 2009 the Association for Cross-Border Cooperation "Lower Danube Euroregion" was created, having its headquarters in Galați. In December 2009, the Presidency of this Euroregion was transferred to Galați County for the next period. Since December 2012, the Euroregion Presidency is assumed by Tulcea County Council.

Lower Danube Euroregion is formed by Galați County, Brăila County, Tulcea County in Romania, Cantemir County and Cahul County in Republic of Moldova and Odessa Oblast in Ukraine.

Largest cities
Romania : Galați (295,000) and Brăila (219,496), both with a metro of 600,000, Tulcea (91,875), Tecuci (53,000)
Republic of Moldova : Cahul (35,481) and Cantemir (12,734)
Ukraine : Odessa (1,001,000)

Euroregions of Romania
Regions of Moldova
Regions of Europe
Euroregions of Ukraine